The 2002 Chicago Cubs season was the 131st season of the Chicago Cubs franchise, the 127th in the National League and the 87th at Wrigley Field. The Cubs finished fifth in the National League Central with a record of 67–95.

Offseason
 November 2, 2001: Mark Bellhorn was traded by the Oakland Athletics to the Chicago Cubs for Adam Morrissey (minors).
 January 16, 2002: Alan Benes was signed as a free agent with the Chicago Cubs.
 March 27, 2002: Dontrelle Willis was traded by the Chicago Cubs with Jose Cueto (minors), Ryan Jorgensen, and Julián Tavárez to the Florida Marlins for Antonio Alfonseca and Matt Clement.

Regular season

Season standings

National League Central

Record vs. opponents

Notable transactions 
 September 4, 2002: Bill Mueller was traded by the Chicago Cubs with cash to the San Francisco Giants for Jeff Verplancke (minors).

Roster

Player stats

Batting

Starters by position 
Note: Pos = Position; G = Games played; AB = At bats; H = Hits; Avg. = Batting average; HR = Home runs; RBI = Runs batted in

Other batters 
Note: G = Games played; AB = At bats; H = Hits; Avg. = Batting average; HR = Home runs; RBI = Runs batted in

Pitching

Starting pitchers 
Note: G = Games pitched; IP = Innings pitched; W = Wins; L = Losses; ERA = Earned run average; SO = Strikeouts

Other pitchers 
Note: G = Games pitched; IP = Innings pitched; W = Wins; L = Losses; ERA = Earned run average; SO = Strikeouts

Relief pitchers 
Note: G = Games pitched; W = Wins; L = Losses; SV = Saves; ERA = Earned run average; SO = Strikeouts

Farm system 

LEAGUE CHAMPIONS: Boise, AZL Cubs

References

2002 Chicago Cubs season at Baseball Reference

Chicago Cubs seasons
Chicago Cubs season
Cub